Defending champions Lisa Raymond and Samantha Stosur defeated Cara Black and Rennae Stubbs in a rematch of the previous year's final, 3–6, 6–3, 6–3 to win the doubles tennis title at the 2006 WTA Tour Championships. With the win, they secured the joint-year-end world No. 1 ranking.

Seeds

Draw

Finals

References

Doubles